William Leonard Courtney (1850 – 1 November 1928) was an English author, philosopher and journalist whose 38-year career encompassed work on the Daily Telegraph and Fortnightly Review.

Early life and education
Courtney was born at Poona, India, the youngest of three sons and three daughters born to William Courtney, of the Indian Civil Service, and Ann Edwardes, daughter of Captain Edward Scott, RN. He was educated at Merton College, Oxford, where he was a contemporary of F H Bradley.

Career
In 1873, he became headmaster of Somersetshire College, Bath. Returning to New Oxford in 1876 he became a tutor in philosophy at New College, where his essays on Plato gained attention. Philosophical studies such as The Metaphysics of John Stuart Mill (1879), Studies in Philosophy (1882), and Constructive Ethics (1886) were written during this period. With Benjamin Jowett he helped with the foundation of the New Theatre. 

In 1890 Courtney joined the Daily Telegraph, beginning a 38 year career on Fleet Street, writing general articles as well as drama and literary criticism. From 1894 he became editor of the Fortnightly Review. Books during this time included The Feminine Note in Fiction (1904). His plays were not commercially successful.

Personal life
In 1874, he married Cordelia Blanche Place; they later had seven children. Cordelia died in 1907. In 1911, William married Janet Elizabeth Hogarth (Janet E. Courtney). Janet (27 November 1865 - 24 September 1954), who was born in Barton-on-Humber, was a scholar, writer, and early feminist. A grandson, through his son Geoffrey Stuart Courtney, a diplomat and soldier, was the actor Nicholas Courtney.

Works

Studies on Philosophy (1882)
Constructive Ethics (1886)
Studies New and Old (1888)
Life of John Stuart Mill (1889)
 Kit Marlowe's Death (1890)
Studies at Leisure (1892)
The Idea of Tragedy (1900)

The Development of Maeterlinck (1904)
The Feminine Note in Fiction (1904)
Rosemary's Letter Book (1909)
In Search of Egeria (1911)
 Armageddon - and After (1914)
Pillars of Empire (1918)

References

External links
 
 
 

English non-fiction writers
1850 births
1928 deaths
English male non-fiction writers
Writers from Pune